The 1964 Mohamed V Cup Final was the 3rd. edition of the Mohammed V Cup, an annual football friendly competition hosted in Casablanca and named after King Mohammed V.

This edition, held in Stade d'Honneur in Meknes was contested by four teams, two from Europe, one from South America and one from the host country, all of them being the reigning champions of their respective leagues. Argentine side Boca Juniors was the winner after beating Saint-Étienne and Real Madrid in the final.

Teams

Venue

Matches

Semifinals

Third place

Final

Standings

Winners

Aftermath 

Although a friendly competition, the Mohamed Cup trophy was the first intercontinental cup won by Boca Juniors, as neither the club nor any Argentine team had participated in similar competitions such as Copa Rio or the Small Club World Cup. One year before, Boca Juniors had failed to win the 1963 Copa Libertadores after it was defeated by Brazilian side Santos FC leaded by Pelé in the finals.

On the other hand, it was the third time Boca Juniors played Real Madrid in their history, after the first meeting during the successful tour to Europe in 1925 (Boca won 1–0), and a friendly match when Real Madrid toured on the Americas in 1927, which was also the first time that club visited the landmass, in a tour that extended for over three months from Buenos Aires to New York.

The 2000 Intercontinental Cup would be the first official match between both clubs. Boca Juniors won 2–1 achieving their second intercontinental title.

References 

m
m
m